The Madonna of Port Lligat is a pair of paintings by Salvador Dalí. The first was created in 1949, measuring 49 x 37.5 centimetres (19.3 x 14.8 in), and is housed in the Haggerty Museum of Art at Marquette University in Milwaukee, Wisconsin, USA. Dalí presented it to Pope Pius XII in an audience for approval, which was granted. Dalí created a second painting in 1950 with the same title and same themes, with various poses and details changed, measuring 275.3 x 209.8 centimetres (108.4 x 82.6 in). The 1950 Madonna is exhibited at the Fukuoka Art Museum in Japan.

The paintings depict a seated Madonna (posed by Dalí's wife, Gala) with the infant Christ on her lap. Both figures have rectangular holes cut into their torsos, suggestive of their transcendent status. In the 1950 version Christ has bread at the center of his figure.  They are posed in a landscape, with features of the coast of Port Lligat, Catalonia, in the background, with surrealist details including nails, fish, seashells, and an egg. The 1949 Madonna has a sea urchin; the 1950 Madonna has a rhinoceros and figures of angels, also posed by Gala.

Cultural influence 

A poem and book based on the painting, The Virgin of Port Lligat by Fray Angelico Chavez, was selected as one of the best books of 1959 by the Catholic Library Association.

In Larry Niven's novel Protector, one of the main characters has this painting on his spacesuit.

References

External links 

 The Madonna of Port Lligat, 1950 by Salvador Dali
 Dali’s The Madonna of Port Lligat

Paintings by Salvador Dalí
1949 paintings
Modern paintings
Paintings of the Madonna and Child
1950 paintings
Seashells in art